Sandu Shui Autonomous County is an autonomous county in the southeast of Guizhou province, China. It is under the administration of the Qiannan Buyei and Miao Autonomous Prefecture, and the only Shui Autonomous County in China; 63% of Shui in China live in this county, which is the heartland of the Shui people. Per a 2022 county government publication, Sandu has a population of 381,000, 97% of whom belong to ethnic minorities, and 67% of the total population are Shui.

It is one of the poorest counties of Guizhou. Most of the county is forested and it is noted for its clean air.

Administrative divisions 
Sandu administers the following 2 subdistricts and 6 towns:

 Sanhe Subdistrict
 
 
 
 
 
 
 

Geography

All of Sandu belongs to the watershed of the Liu River which flows into the Pearl River. The Duliu River has its source in Sandu and flows into the Liu River. The county is rather mountainous with Karst landscape resulting in large locale temperature and climate differences. Antimony is mined commercially in Sandu.

Climate

Demographics 
As of 2021, Sandu Shui Autonomous County has a registered hukou population of 380,871, of which, 96,869 belong to urban areas, and the remaining 284,002 belong to rural areas, giving the autonomous county an urbanization rate of 25.43%.

Per a 2022 county government publication, 67% of the autonomous county's population is ethnically Shui, another 30% belong to other recognized ethnic minorities, and just 3% of the population is ethnically Han Chinese.

The average annual disposable income for urban residents as of 2021 totaled 35,874 renminbi (RMB), a 9% increase from the previous year, and the second highest among county-level divisions in the Qiannan Buyei and Miao Autonomous Prefecture.

Transport 
Sandu is served by the Guiyang–Guangzhou high-speed railway, with a travel time of 50 minutes to Guiyang. It is also connected by G76 Xiamen–Chengdu Expressway and several provincial expressways.

References

 
County-level divisions of Guizhou
Qiannan Buyei and Miao Autonomous Prefecture
Shui autonomous counties